The bombard is a contemporary conical-bore double-reed instrument widely used to play traditional Breton music. The bombard is a woodwind instrument, and a member of the shawm family. Like most shawms, it has a broad and very powerful sound, vaguely resembling a trumpet. It is played as other shawms are played, with the double reed placed between the lips. The second octave is 'over-blown'; achieved via increased lip and air pressure or through the use of an octave key. It plays a diatonic scale of up to two octaves, although contemporary instruments frequently have added keywork permitting some degree of chromaticism. A bombard player is known as a talabarder after 'talabard', the older Breton name for the bombard.

The tradition: Sonneurs de Couple

Traditional Breton musicians are referred to as Sonerien (in Breton) or Sonneurs (in French). Musicians playing in pairs are also referred to as "sonneurs de couple". While 'Soner' originally referred only to the bombard player, the meaning long ago expanded to also include other traditional musicians. Call-and-response remains a central aspect of Breton music regardless of the instruments used. The paired kan ha diskan vocal tradition, which remains vitally active today, perhaps formed the original basis for all other pairings of Breton musicians. In some parts of Brittany from the late 19th century onwards, the most popular 'sonneurs de couple' were the paired treujenn gaol clarinet and accompanying button accordion.

Bombards in their most traditional setting are accompanied by a bagpipe called a biniou kozh ("ancient bagpipe"), which plays an octave above the bombard. The bombard calls, and the biniou responds. The bombard requires so much lip pressure and breath support that a talabarder can rarely play a sustained melody line. The biniou plays the melody continuously, while the bombard takes breaks, establishing the call-and-response pattern. Prior to World War I, a given pair of Soners would typically cover all of the weddings, funerals, and other social occasions within a given territory, which would be jealously guarded from other performers. This duet of bombard and pipes, also occasionally accompanied by a drummer in past centuries, has been practiced for at least 500 years in Brittany in an unbroken tradition and must be considered the heart and soul of this instrument's place in Breton culture.

Revival in the bagadoù

In the first part of the twentieth century, the number of players of bombards and biniou kozh decreased significantly. In the late '40s, the creation of the Bagad, a specifically Breton ensemble of bagpipes, bombards and drums, by figures such as Polig Monjarret and the organization Bodadeg ar Sonerion (Brotherhood of Musicians), offered a new role to the bombard. Now most towns in Brittany have one or several Bagadoù (plural in Breton for "Bagad"), and they continually compete with each other in a series of annual tournaments and festivals. As the bagad is a Breton take on the Scottish pipe band concept, the music initially performed was typically martial in character. Now the Bagadoù play dance music, traditional melodies and new compositions. The large number of bombard players in the Bagadoù has been a key factor in the successful popularization of the instrument.  Another key factor has been the revitalization of the traditional pairing of the bombard and biniou in the 1970s with the Breton cultural revival, thanks to the success of Alan Stivell and the development of "Fest Noz" dances and traditional music competitions.

Still evolving: Fest-Noz and beyond
"Essentially a shawm or oboe--that is, a pipe with a conical bore, a double reed, and finger-holes...traditional Breton bombardoù are probably very close to the original progenitor of the oboe family." The bombard is an instrument that has been in constant evolution, with many different keys developed as well as sophisticated silver key-work enabling chromatic possibilities. Milder versions in lower ranges such as Youenn Le Bihan's "piston" (an oboe/bombard hybrid, typically based in the key of Re/D) have been developed for use in mixed ensembles. A class of professional musicians and instrument makers has emerged, as well as standardized reeds and commonly available tutorial materials. Today, both the biniou and bombard are played in combination with an unlimited number of instruments (voice, saxophone, piano, organ, clarinet or treujenn gaol, fiddle, flutes, guitar, percussion… ) in fest-noz, groups and ensembles of all styles - from classical to folk, rock, pop, punk, metal - in arrangements of traditional Breton dance tunes or in new compositions.

Musicians and instrument makers

 Some sonerien:
 Gildas Moal
 Christian Faucheur
 Georges Epinette
 André Le Meut..
 Jorj Botuha
 Christophe Caron
 Sabine Le Coadou
 Cyrille Bonneau
 David Pasquet
 Josick Allot
 Eric Beaumin
 Odran Plantec
 Jean Baron
 Mathieu Sérot
 Stéphane Hardy
 Serge Riou
 Yann Kermabon
 Youenn Le Bihan
 Ivonig Le Mestre
 Erwan Hamon
 Daniel Feon
 Jil Lehart (Gilles Lehart)

 Some instrument makers:
 Hervieux & Glet
 Jorj Botuha
 Youenn Le Bihan
 Axone (Jean-Luc Ollivier)
 Yvon Le Coant
 Jil Lehart (Gilles Lehart)
 Christian Besrechel
 Éric Ollu
 Rudy Le Doyen
 Dorig Le Voyer

 Some recordings:
 "Evit Dañsal" Jil Lehart and Daniel Féon
 "An disput" Gildas Moal and René Chaplain
 "Plijadur" Jorj Botuha, with Pascal Guingo, Philippe Quillay, Pascal Marsault
 "Kerzh Ba'n Dañs" Skolvan

Films
Of Pipers and Wrens (1997).  Produced and directed by Gei Zantzinger, in collaboration with Dastum.  Lois V. Kuter, ethnomusicological consultant.  Devault, Pennsylvania:  Constant Spring Productions.

Notes

References

External links 

 Free method for self-learning the Breton Bombard (pdf to download)

Breton musical instruments
Celtic musical instruments
French musical instruments
Oboes
Single oboes with conical bore